Ida Kadlec (born 6 October 1929) is an Austrian gymnast. She competed in seven events at the 1952 Summer Olympics.

References

External links

1929 births
Possibly living people
Austrian female artistic gymnasts
Olympic gymnasts of Austria
Gymnasts at the 1952 Summer Olympics
Place of birth missing (living people)